Greg Seamon (born July 25, 1955) is an American football coach. He served as an assistant coach for the Dallas Cowboys in 2002 and for the Cleveland Browns from 2016 to 2018.

References

1955 births
Living people
Purdue Boilermakers football coaches
Army Black Knights football coaches
Pacific Tigers football coaches
Navy Midshipmen football coaches
Akron Zips football coaches
Cincinnati Bearcats football coaches
Miami RedHawks football coaches
Dallas Cowboys coaches
Cleveland Browns coaches